Øyvind Bolthof (born March 30, 1977) is a Norwegian football goalkeeper.

His earlier clubs are Lyn, Bøler IF, Bækkelagets SK and Årvoll IL, but he joined Vålerenga already in 1995. After the arrival of Árni Gautur Arason to Vålerenga in 2004, Bolthof has been the second choice keeper and has played mainly on the reserves team.

Parallel to his football career, Bolthof has taken the siviløkonom degree at BI Norwegian Business School.

Honours
 Norwegian Premier League:
 Winner (1): 2005
 Norwegian Football Cup:
 Winner (3): 1997, 2002, 2008

External links
 Profile at the club website
 

Footballers from Oslo
Association football goalkeepers
Norwegian footballers
Vålerenga Fotball players
BI Norwegian Business School alumni
1977 births
Living people